Rachel Hannah Weisz (born 7 March 1970) is an English actress, and the recipient of various accolades, including an Academy Award, a Laurence Olivier Award, and a BAFTA Award.

Weisz began acting in British stage and television productions in the early 1990s, and made her film debut in Death Machine (1994). She won a Critics' Circle Theatre Award for her role in the 1994 revival of Noël Coward's play Design for Living, and went on to appear in the 1999 Donmar Warehouse production of Tennessee Williams' drama Suddenly, Last Summer. 

Her film breakthrough came with her starring role as Evelyn Carnahan in the Hollywood action films The Mummy (1999) and The Mummy Returns (2001). Weisz went on to star in several films of the 2000s, including Enemy at the Gates (2001), About a Boy (2002), Runaway Jury (2003), Constantine (2005), The Fountain (2006), Fred Claus (2007) and The Lovely Bones (2009).

For her performance as an activist in the 2005 thriller The Constant Gardener, she won the Academy Award for Best Supporting Actress, and for playing Blanche DuBois in a 2009 revival of A Streetcar Named Desire, she won the Laurence Olivier Award for Best Actress. In the 2010s, Weisz continued to star in big-budget films such as the action film The Bourne Legacy (2012) and the fantasy film Oz the Great and Powerful (2013), and garnered critical acclaim for her performances in the independent films The Deep Blue Sea (2011), Denial (2016), and The Favourite (2018). For her portrayal of Sarah Churchill in the latter, she won the BAFTA Award for Best Actress in a Supporting Role and received a second Academy Award nomination. In 2021, Weisz played Melina Vostokoff in the Marvel Cinematic Universe film Black Widow.

Weisz was engaged to filmmaker Darren Aronofsky, with whom she has a son, from 2005 to 2010. She married actor Daniel Craig in 2011, with whom she has a daughter, and became a naturalised US citizen the same year.

Early life and family
Weisz was born on 7 March 1970 in Westminster, London, and grew up in Hampstead Garden Suburb. Her father, George Weisz (1929–2020), was a Hungarian Jewish mechanical engineer. Her mother, Edith Ruth (born Teich; 1932–2016), was a teacher-turned-psychotherapist originally from Vienna, Austria. Her parents both emigrated to the United Kingdom as children around 1938, prior to the outbreak of World War II, in order to escape the Nazis. Her maternal grandfather's ancestry was Austrian Jewish; her maternal grandmother's ancestry was Italian Roman Catholic. The scholar and social activist James Parkes helped her mother's family to leave Austria for England. Weisz's mother was raised in the Catholic church and formally converted to Judaism upon marrying Weisz's father. Weisz's maternal grandfather was Alexander Teich, a Jewish activist who had been a secretary of the World Union of Jewish Students. Her younger sister Minnie Weisz is a visual artist.

Weisz's parents valued the arts; they also encouraged their children to form opinions of their own by engaging their participation in family debates. Weisz left North London Collegiate School and attended Benenden School for one year, completing A-levels at St Paul's Girls School.

Known for being an "English rose", Weisz began modelling at the age of 14. In 1984, she gained public attention when she turned down an offer to star in King David with Richard Gere.

Weisz went to Trinity Hall, Cambridge, where she read English. She graduated with upper second-class honours. During her university years she was a contemporary of Sacha Baron Cohen, Alexander Armstrong, Emily Maitlis, Sue Perkins, Mel Giedroyc, Richard Osman and Ben Miller (whom she briefly dated), and appeared in various student dramatic productions, co-founding a student drama group called Cambridge Talking Tongues. The group won a Guardian Student Drama Award at the 1991 Edinburgh Festival Fringe for an improvised piece called Slight Possession, directed by David Farr.

Career

Early work and breakthrough (1992–1998)
In 1992, Weisz appeared in the television film Advocates II, followed by roles in the Inspector Morse episode "Twilight of the Gods", and the BBC's steamy period drama Scarlet and Black, alongside Ewan McGregor. Dirty Something, a BBC Screen Two, hour-long television film made in 1992, was Weisz's first film, in which she played Becca, who met and fell in love with a traveller, Dog (Paul Reynolds), at the end of Glastonbury Festival. The opening scenes were filmed at the festival. Also starring as an older fellow traveller and sage was Larry (Bernard Hill).

Weisz's breakthrough role on the stage was that of Gilda in Sean Mathias's 1994 revival of Noël Coward's Design for Living at the Gielgud Theatre, for which she received the London Critics' Circle Award for the most promising newcomer. Her portrayal was described as "wonderful" by a contemporary review.

Weisz started her film career with a minor role in the 1994 film Death Machine, but her first major role came in the 1996 film Chain Reaction, which also starred Keanu Reeves and Morgan Freeman. While the film received mostly negative reviews–it holds a 16% rating on Rotten Tomatoes–it was a minor financial success. She next appeared as Miranda Fox in Stealing Beauty, directed by Bernardo Bertolucci, where she was first labelled an "English rose".

Following this, Weisz found roles in the 1997 American drama Swept from the Sea, the 1998 British television comedy-drama My Summer with Des, Michael Winterbottom's crime film I Want You, and David Leland's The Land Girls, based on Angela Huth's book of the same name.

International recognition and critical success (1999–2009)
In 1999, Weisz played Greta in the historical film Sunshine. The same year, her international breakthrough came with the 1999 adventure film The Mummy, in which she played the female lead opposite Brendan Fraser. Her character, Evelyn Carnahan, is an English Egyptologist, who undertakes an expedition to the fictional ancient Egyptian city of Hamunaptra to discover an ancient book. Variety criticised the direction of the film, writing: "(the actors) have been directed to broad, undisciplined performances [...] Buffoonery hardly seems like Weisz's natural domain, as the actress strains for comic effects that she can't achieve". She followed this up with the sequel The Mummy Returns in 2001, which grossed an estimated $433 million worldwide, (equivalent to $ million in  dollars) higher than the original's $260 million (equal to $ million in  dollars).

Also in 1999, she played the role of Catherine in the Donmar Warehouse production of Tennessee Williams' Suddenly Last Summer, What's on Stage called her "captivating", stating that she brought "a degree of credibility to a difficult part". The same year, Weisz appeared in Neil LaBute's The Shape of Things at the Almeida Theatre, then temporarily located in London's King's Cross, for which she received a Theatre World Award. CurtainUp called her "a sophisticated, independent artist" with "great stage presence".

In 2000, she portrayed Petula in the film Beautiful Creatures, following this up with 2001's Enemy at the Gates, and the 2002 comedy-drama About a Boy, with Hugh Grant, based on Nick Hornby's 1998 novel. In 2003, she played Marlee in the adaptation of John Grisham's legal thriller novel The Runaway Jury, along with Dustin Hoffman, John Cusack, and Gene Hackman; and starred in the film adaptation of the romantic comedy-drama play The Shape of Things.

In 2004, Weisz appeared in the comedy Envy, opposite Ben Stiller, Jack Black, and Christopher Walken. The film failed at the box office. Variety opined that Weisz and co-star Amy Poehler "get fewer choice moments than they deserve." Her next role was alongside Keanu Reeves in Constantine, based on the comic book Hellblazer. Film Threat called her portrayal "effective at projecting scepticism and, eventually, dawning horror".

Her next appearance, in 2005, was in Fernando Meirelles's The Constant Gardener, a film adaptation of a John le Carré thriller set in the slums of Kibera and Loiyangalani, Kenya. Weisz played an activist, Tessa Quayle, married to a British embassy official. The film was critically acclaimed, earning Weisz the Academy Award for Best Supporting Actress, the Golden Globe Award for Best Supporting Actress, and the Screen Actors Guild Award for Outstanding Performance by a Female Actor in a Supporting Role. UK newspaper The Guardian noted that the film "established her in the front rank of British actors", while the BBC wrote: "Weisz is exceptional: film star charisma coupled with raw emotion in a performance to fall in love with". In 2006, she received the BAFTA Britannia Award for British Artist of the Year.

In 2006, Weisz starred in Darren Aronofsky's romantic drama The Fountain. The San Francisco Chronicle found her portrayal of Queen Isabel "less convincing" than other roles. That same year, she provided the voice for Saphira the dragon in the fantasy film Eragon; and rejected an offer to star in The Mummy: Tomb of the Dragon Emperor due to script issues. The part eventually went to Maria Bello. Her subsequent films include the 2007 Wong Kar-wai drama My Blueberry Nights, and Rian Johnson's 2008 caper film The Brothers Bloom, alongside Adrien Brody and Mark Ruffalo. In 2009, she played the lead role of Hypatia of Alexandria in the historical drama film Agora, a Spanish production directed by Alejandro Amenábar. The New York Times called her portrayal "adept", noting that she imparted "a sympathetic presence". That same year, she appeared as Blanche DuBois, in Rob Ashford's revival of the play A Streetcar Named Desire. Her performance in the play was praised by the critics, the Daily Telegraph noted that she "rises to the challenge magnificently".

Established actress and further acclaim (2010–present)

Weisz starred in the film The Whistleblower, which debuted at the Toronto International Film Festival in 2010. The film was based on the true story of human trafficking by employees of contractor DynCorp. During its première, the intense depiction of the treatment meted out to victims by the kidnappers made a woman in the audience faint. Variety magazine wrote "Weisz's performance holds the viewer every step of the way." That same year, she guest-starred in the animated series The Simpsons, in the 22nd season episode "How Munched is That Birdie in the Window?". Weisz's 2011 roles included an adaptation of Terence Rattigan's play The Deep Blue Sea, Fernando Meirelles' psychosexual drama 360 opposite Jude Law again and Anthony Hopkins, the BBC espionage thriller Page Eight, and the thriller film Dream House, alongside Daniel Craig.

She filmed scenes for To the Wonder, a 2012 romantic drama film written and directed by Terrence Malick, alongside Ben Affleck, Olga Kurylenko, Javier Bardem, and Rachel McAdams; her scenes were cut. She has also starred in the 2012 action thriller film The Bourne Legacy based on the series of books by Robert Ludlum.

In 2013, Weisz starred on Broadway alongside her husband, Daniel Craig, in a revival of Harold Pinter's Betrayal. It opened 27 October 2013, and closed 5 January 2014. Despite mixed reviews, box office receipts of $17.5 million made it the second highest grossing Broadway play of 2013. That same year, Weisz played Evanora in the fantasy film Oz the Great and Powerful.

In 2015, she appeared in drama film Youth and in science fiction film The Lobster. The film won Cannes Jury Prize. In 2016, she appeared in the drama film The Light Between Oceans, with Michael Fassbender and Alicia Vikander, and portrayed Holocaust historian Deborah Lipstadt in Denial, a film based on Lipstadt's book, and directed by Mick Jackson. 

In 2017 Weisz starred in My Cousin Rachel, a drama based on Daphne du Maurier's novel, and in 2018 co-starred in a British biographical film about sailor Donald Crowhurst, The Mercy, directed by James Marsh.

Weisz's production company, LC6 Productions, released its first feature film, Disobedience, in 2017, starring Weisz and Rachel McAdams. Weisz grew up three underground stops away from where the film is set in London. Raised Jewish, she never fully connected to the faith. She claims she was "really disobedient" herself, and has never felt she fits in anywhere.

In 2018, Weisz played Sarah Churchill in The Favourite, winning the BAFTA Award for Best Actress in a Supporting Role and receiving her second nomination for the Academy Award for Best Supporting Actress. In April 2019, she entered talks to join Scarlett Johansson in the Marvel Cinematic Universe film Black Widow. In July of that year, Weisz was announced to play Melina Vostokoff in the film, which was released on 9 July 2021.

Upcoming projects
Weisz will next star and executive produce Dead Ringers a remake of the 1988 film of the same name for Amazon Prime Video. She is also set to portray actress Elizabeth Taylor in the biographical drama A Special Relationship, though the film remains in development. The film will chronicle Taylor's life and career from actress to activist. It is set to be directed by Bert and Bertie, and produced by See-Saw Films, with a script written by Simon Beaufoy. She is attached to star alongside Colin Farrell in Love Child, directed by Todd Solondz. She is also set to star in a new film adaptation of Seance on a Wet Afternoon, based on the 1961 suspense novel of the same name by Mark McShane and directed by Tomas Alfredson.

Personal life
In the summer of 2001, Weisz began dating American filmmaker and producer Darren Aronofsky. They met backstage at London's Almeida Theatre, where she was starring in The Shape of Things. Weisz moved to New York with Aronofsky the following year; in 2005, they were engaged. Their son was born in May 2006 in New York City. The couple resided in the East Village in Manhattan. In November 2010, Weisz and Aronofsky announced that they had been apart for months, but remained close friends and were committed to bringing up their son together in New York.

Weisz and actor Daniel Craig had been friends for many years, and worked together on the film Dream House. They began dating in December 2010 and they married on 22 June 2011 in a private New York ceremony, with four guests in attendance, including Weisz's son and Craig's daughter. On 1 September 2018, it was reported that they had their first child together, a daughter.

Throughout her career, Weisz has been featured on the covers of magazines, such as Vogue. She served as a muse to fashion designer Narciso Rodriguez, and was named L'Oréal's global ambassador in 2010.

Weisz learned karate for her role in Brothers Bloom.

A British citizen by birth, Weisz became a naturalized US citizen in 2011.

Acting credits

Film

Television

Theatre

Awards and nominations

See also
List of British Academy Award nominees and winners
List of Jewish Academy Award winners and nominees
List of actors with Academy Award nominations
List of actors with two or more Academy Award nominations in acting categories

Notes

References

External links

1970s births
20th-century English actresses
21st-century English actresses
Actresses from London
Age controversies
Alumni of Trinity Hall, Cambridge
American film actresses
American people of Austrian-Jewish descent
American people of Hungarian-Jewish descent
American people of Italian descent
American stage actresses
American television actresses
Audiobook narrators
Best Supporting Actress Academy Award winners
Best Supporting Actress BAFTA Award winners
Best Supporting Actress Golden Globe (film) winners
British child models
Critics' Circle Theatre Award winners
English emigrants to the United States
English female models
English film actresses
English people of Austrian-Jewish descent
English people of Hungarian-Jewish descent
English people of Italian descent
English stage actresses
English television actresses
Jewish American actresses
Jewish English actresses
Jewish female models
Living people
Models from London
Naturalized citizens of the United States
Outstanding Performance by a Female Actor in a Supporting Role Screen Actors Guild Award winners
People educated at Benenden School
People educated at North London Collegiate School
People educated at St Paul's Girls' School
People from the East Village, Manhattan
People from Westminster
Theatre World Award winners
21st-century American Jews
21st-century American women
Laurence Olivier Award winners